was a Japanese record label, a subsidiary of Sony Music Japan.

History

2000 – Yoshida transferred to Sony Music Entertainment Japan, and he brought the T Project catalog. He renamed it DefSTAR Records. 
2001 – DefSTAR Records becomes a subsidiary of Sony Music Entertainment. Yoshida becomes its manager.
2003 – Yoshida returned to Warner Music Japan, but did not try to reclaim his label. Instead, he focused on restructuring his first company.
2014 - Defstar Records, Inc. is merged with the six other labels of Sony Music Japan to form Sony Music Labels Inc. and DefSTAR becomes one of labels of Sony Music Labels.
2015 - DefSTAR is absorbed into SME Records.

Artists
Defstar Records' artists include: 
Amoyamo, Burnside Project, Chemistry, Mariko Gotō, Chiaki Kuriyama, Shion Tsuji, SawanoHiroyuki[nZk], Ken Hirai, GARNiDELiA, Hirakawachi 1-chome, Beat Crusaders, Kylee, Kanon Wakeshima, Tomoko Kawase, FLiP, universe, Long Shot Party, On/Off, Lil'B, Sowelu, Pe'zmoku, The Harris and Shiritsu Ebisu Chugaku.
AKB48 used to release products under Defstar, before moving to King Records

References

External links
 
 Defstar Records on Sony Music Entertainment Japan's Corporate Portal

Sony Music Entertainment Japan
Sony subsidiaries
Japanese record labels
Record labels established in 1997